Xiangzikou is a town in Ningxiang City, Hunan Province, China. It is surrounded by Dafu Town on the west, Weishan Township on the north, Huangcai Town on the east, and Longtian Town and Shatian Township on the south.

Administrative division
The town is divided into nine villages and one community: 
 Xiangzikou Community
 Lianhua
 Guanshan
 Shuanghe
 Shichong
 Zhitian
 Huanghe
 Xianlongtan
 Fureng
 Jinfengyuan

Geography

Economy
Chinese chestnut is important to the economy.

Education
There is one senior high school located with the town limits: Ningxiang Tenth Senior High School.

Culture
Huaguxi is the most influence local theater.

Transport
The County Road X104 runs south to Xiangzikou Community, intersecting with  County Road X107, and turns right to Huangcai Town.

The County Road X107 begins at Xiangzikou Community and travels north to Weishan Township.

The County Road X210 begins at Xiangzikou Community and travels southwest to Shatian Township.

Attractions
The Tombs of Zhang Jun, Zhang Shi and Yi Fu are tourist attractions.

On 16 December 2011, local people discovered 128 bridges, which were built during the reign of the Qianlong Emperor (17351796) of the Qing dynasty (1644–1911).

Notable individuals 
Yi Fu, was a noted writer and poet of Song dynasty.

References

External links

Divisions of Ningxiang
Ningxiang